Philip Lee Jones (born 29 May 1973) is a Welsh football coach and former player who played as a forward.

Career

Born in Wrexham, he began his career with his hometown club. In March 1992, he moved to Liverpool, aged 18. However, he only managed four appearances in five years, in part due to suffering two broken legs. He was loaned out to Crewe Alexandra, twice back to Wrexham, and finally to Tranmere Rovers where he scored five goals in eight games. Tranmere signed Jones for £100,000 in June 1997. He spent three years with Tranmere before being released in May 2000. In July, he moved to First Division club Barnsley on a free transfer, but in 2002 he returned to Wrexham for a fourth spell.

In the summer of 2004 he was released, subsequently joining League of Wales side Caernarfon Town. After a brief spell as joint-caretaker manager at Caernarfon (with Kenny Irons), he signed for the NEWI Cefn Druids in November 2006.

He joined Prestatyn Town for a spell that included both playing and as the team's manager from March 2011.

He had a brief spell as joint caretaker manager at Wrexham at the tail-end of the 2014–15 season alongside Carl Darlington following Kevin Wilkin's sacking.

He coached the Glyndŵr University Football Academy at Wrexham F.C before rejoining Tranmere Rovers in June 2016 as Academy Manager.

Jones has represented Wales at Youth, Under-21 and B level, and he also won two caps for the senior side.

References

External links

Lee Jones at TranmereRovers.co.uk
Lee Jones at BarsnleyFC.co.uk

1973 births
Living people
Welsh footballers
Wales youth international footballers
Wales under-21 international footballers
Wales B international footballers
Wales international footballers
Wrexham A.F.C. players
Liverpool F.C. players
Crewe Alexandra F.C. players
Tranmere Rovers F.C. players
Barnsley F.C. players
Caernarfon Town F.C. players
Prestatyn Town F.C. players
Premier League players
English Football League players
Cymru Premier players
Association football forwards
Tranmere Rovers F.C. non-playing staff
Prestatyn Town F.C. managers
Caernarfon Town F.C. managers